Avianca Ecuador S.A. (formerly known as AeroGal) is an airline based in Quito, Ecuador. It operates passenger and cargo flights within Ecuador, between the mainland and the Galápagos Islands, and between Ecuador and Colombia (on behalf of Avianca). It is one of the seven nationally branded airlines (Avianca Costa Rica, Avianca El Salvador, etc.) in the Avianca Group of Latin American airlines.

History

AeroGal was founded in November 1985 by the Ecuadorian businessman Carlos Serrano Lusetti, with the objective of offering air transportation of passengers and cargo in Continental Ecuador and in the Galapagos Archipelago. It began operating in 1986 with 2 Dornier Do 28s with capacity for 12 passengers each.

In October 2009, AeroGal was 80% taken over by Synergy Group, and announced its merger with Avianca, and TACA Airlines. With the merger, the company expanded its connections to Europe. It also merged with Vuelos Internos Privados, being the first Ecuadorian company of this firm, the codes shared with this airline were still preserved in Aerogal's image, but since it merged with AviancaTaca Holding, it was part of the same company.

Avianca made an investment of US $7.2 million to strengthen and modernize the company. Despite the purchase by Avianca, AeroGal continued using its separate identity until June 18, 2014, when the airline  Avianca Ecuador, and continues to operate in Ecuador. On June 18, 2014, AeroGal was renamed under the brand Avianca Ecuador, but the official name was not changed accordingly until in early 2018, when the company was officially renamed to Avianca Ecuador S.A.

Destinations

Fleet

Current fleet

As of February 2022, the Avianca Ecuador fleet includes the following aircraft:

Former fleet
As AeroGal, the airline previously operated the following aircraft:

Accidents and incidents
On October 28, 1997, a Fairchild Hiller FH-227D (registered HC-BUF) was carrying company staff and equipment to the provisional operations base at Ambato. The approach was flown at 100 knots. The touchdown was very late, with just 900 meters of the runway remaining. Ground fine pitch was selected, but the aircraft overran the runway and fell into a deep ravine.

On May 2, 2009, a Boeing 757-200 (registered HC-CHC) was taking off from José Joaquín de Olmedo International Airport, when its right engine suffered repeated compressor stalls and lost power. The crew reduced thrust on that engine to idle, levelled off and returned to Guayaquil for a safe landing about 13 minutes later.

On September 19, 2010, AeroGal's Boeing 767-300ER (registered HC-CIJ) was involved in a near-miss at John F. Kennedy International Airport. Initial reports by the NTSB indicated that the flight was cleared to land on runway 13L, but instead attempted to land on runway 13R. The runway was in use by a JetBlue aircraft who had been cleared for takeoff. The error was spotted by a Delta crew in line for takeoff, who relayed the information to the tower. The air traffic controller issued an order for the flight to turn immediately and was able to prevent the collision.

See also
List of airlines of Ecuador

References

External links

Official website 
Official website 

Avianca
Airlines of Ecuador
Airlines established in 1985
1985 establishments in Ecuador